In modern physics, the double-slit experiment is a demonstration that light and matter can display characteristics of both classically defined waves and particles; moreover, it displays the fundamentally probabilistic nature of quantum mechanical phenomena. This type of experiment was first performed by Thomas Young in 1801, as a demonstration of the wave behavior of visible light. At that time it was thought that light consisted of either waves or particles. With the beginning of modern physics, about a hundred years later, it was realized that light could in fact show behavior characteristic of both waves and particles. In 1927, Davisson and Germer demonstrated that electrons show the same behavior, which was later extended to atoms and molecules. Thomas Young's experiment with light was part of classical physics long before the development of quantum mechanics and the concept of wave–particle duality. He believed it demonstrated that the wave theory of light was correct, and his experiment is sometimes referred to as Young's experiment or Young's slits.

The experiment belongs to a general class of "double path" experiments, in which a wave is split into two separate waves (the wave is typically made of many photons and better referred to as a wave front, not to be confused with the wave properties of the individual photon) that later combine into a single wave. Changes in the path-lengths of both waves result in a phase shift, creating an interference pattern. Another version is the Mach–Zehnder interferometer, which splits the beam with a beam splitter.

In the basic version of this experiment, a coherent light source, such as a laser beam, illuminates a plate pierced by two parallel slits, and the light passing through the slits is observed on a screen behind the plate. The wave nature of light causes the light waves passing through the two slits to interfere, producing bright and dark bands on the screen – a result that would not be expected if light consisted of classical particles. However, the light is always found to be absorbed at the screen at discrete points, as individual particles (not waves); the interference pattern appears via the varying density of these particle hits on the screen. Furthermore, versions of the experiment that include detectors at the slits find that each detected photon passes through one slit (as would a classical particle), and not through both slits (as would a wave). However, such experiments demonstrate that particles do not form the interference pattern if one detects which slit they pass through. These results demonstrate the principle of wave–particle duality.

Other atomic-scale entities, such as electrons, are found to exhibit the same behavior when fired towards a double slit. Additionally, the detection of individual discrete impacts is observed to be inherently probabilistic, which is inexplicable using classical mechanics.

The experiment can be done with entities much larger than electrons and photons, although it becomes more difficult as size increases. The largest entities for which the double-slit experiment has been performed were molecules that each comprised 2000 atoms (whose total mass was 25,000 atomic mass units).

The double-slit experiment (and its variations) has become a classic for its clarity in expressing the central puzzles of quantum mechanics. Because it demonstrates the fundamental limitation of the ability of the observer to predict experimental results, Richard Feynman called it "a phenomenon which is impossible […] to explain in any classical way, and which has in it the heart of quantum mechanics.  In reality, it contains the only mystery [of quantum mechanics]."

Overview

If light consisted strictly of ordinary or classical particles, and these particles were fired in a straight line through a slit and allowed to strike a screen on the other side, we would expect to see a pattern corresponding to the size and shape of the slit. However, when this "single-slit experiment" is actually performed, the pattern on the screen is a diffraction pattern in which the light is spread out. The smaller the slit, the greater the angle of spread. The top portion of the image shows the central portion of the pattern formed when a red laser illuminates a slit and, if one looks carefully, two faint side bands. More bands can be seen with a more highly refined apparatus. Diffraction explains the pattern as being the result of the interference of light waves from the slit.

If one illuminates two parallel slits, the light from the two slits again interferes. Here the interference is a more pronounced pattern with a series of alternating light and dark bands. The width of the bands is a property of the frequency of the illuminating light. (See the bottom photograph to the right.) When Thomas Young (1773–1829) first demonstrated this phenomenon, it indicated that light consists of waves, as the distribution of brightness can be explained by the alternately additive and subtractive interference of wavefronts. Young's experiment, performed in the early 1800s, played a crucial role in the understanding of the wave theory of light, vanquishing the corpuscular theory of light proposed by Isaac Newton, which had been the accepted model of light propagation in the 17th and 18th centuries. However, the later discovery of the photoelectric effect demonstrated that under different circumstances, light can behave as if it is composed of discrete particles. These seemingly contradictory discoveries made it necessary to go beyond classical physics and take into account the quantum nature of light.

Feynman was fond of saying that all of quantum mechanics can be gleaned from carefully thinking through the implications of this single experiment. He also proposed (as a thought experiment) that if detectors were placed before each slit, the interference pattern would disappear.

The Englert–Greenberger duality relation provides a detailed treatment of the mathematics of double-slit interference in the context of quantum mechanics.

A low-intensity double-slit experiment was first performed by G. I. Taylor in 1909, by reducing the level of incident light until photon emission/absorption events were mostly non-overlapping.

A double-slit experiment was not performed with anything other than light until 1961, when Claus Jönsson of the University of Tübingen performed it with electron beams. In 1974, the Italian physicists Pier Giorgio Merli, Gian Franco Missiroli, and Giulio Pozzi repeated the experiment using single electrons and biprism (instead of slits), showing that each electron interferes with itself as predicted by quantum theory. In 2002, the single-electron version of the experiment was voted "the most beautiful experiment" by readers of Physics World.

In 2012, Stefano Frabboni and co-workers eventually performed the double-slit experiment with electrons and real slits, following the original scheme proposed by Feynman. They sent single electrons onto nanofabricated slits (about 100 nm wide) and, by collecting the transmitted electrons with a single-electron detector, they could show the build-up of a double-slit interference pattern.

In 2018, single particle interference has been first demonstrated for antimatter in the Positron Laboratory (L-NESS, Politecnico di Milano) of Rafael Ferragut in Como (Italy), by a group led by Marco Giammarchi.

Variations of the experiment

Interference of individual particles

An important version of this experiment involves single particles. Sending particles through a double-slit apparatus one at a time results in single particles appearing on the screen, as expected. Remarkably, however, an interference pattern emerges when these particles are allowed to build up one by one (see the adjacent image). This demonstrates the wave–particle duality, which states that all matter exhibits both wave and particle properties: The particle is measured as a single pulse at a single position, while the wave describes the probability of absorbing the particle at a specific place on the screen. This phenomenon has been shown to occur with photons, electrons, atoms, and even some molecules. Success was achieved with buckminsterfullerene in 2001, with 2 molecules of 430 atoms ( and ) in 2011, and with molecules of up to 2000 atoms in 2019.

The probability of detection is the square of the amplitude of the wave and can be calculated with classical waves (see below). Ever since the origination of quantum mechanics, some theorists have searched for ways to incorporate additional determinants or "hidden variables" that, were they to become known, would account for the location of each individual impact with the target.

Mach-Zehnder interferometer

The Mach–Zehnder interferometer can be seen as a simplified version of the double-slit experiment. Instead of propagating through free space after the two slits, and hitting any position in an extended screen, in the interferometer the photons can only propagate via two paths, and hit two discrete photodetectors. This makes it possible to describe it via simple linear algebra in dimension 2, rather than differential equations.

A photon emitted by the laser hits the first beam splitter and is then in a superposition between the two possible paths. In the second beam splitter these paths interfere, causing the photon to hit the photodetector on the right with probability one, and the photodetector on the bottom with probability zero. It is interesting to consider what would happen if the photon were definitely in either of paths between the beam splitters. This can be accomplished by blocking one of the paths, or equivalently by detecting the presence of a photon there. In both cases there will be no interference between the paths anymore, and both photodetectors will be hit with probability 1/2. From this we can conclude that the photon does not take one path or another after the first beam splitter, but rather that it is in a genuine quantum superposition of the two paths.

"Which-way" experiments and the principle of complementarity
A well-known thought experiment predicts that if particle detectors are positioned at the slits, showing through which slit a photon goes, the interference pattern will disappear. This which-way experiment illustrates the complementarity principle that photons can behave as either particles or waves, but cannot be observed as both at the same time.
Despite the importance of this thought experiment in the history of quantum mechanics (for example, see the discussion on Einstein's version of this experiment), technically feasible realizations of this experiment were not proposed until the 1970s. (Naive implementations of the textbook thought experiment are not possible because photons cannot be detected without absorbing the photon.) Currently, multiple experiments have been performed illustrating various aspects of complementarity.

An experiment performed in 1987 produced results that demonstrated that information could be obtained regarding which path a particle had taken without destroying the interference altogether. This showed the effect of measurements that disturbed the particles in transit to a lesser degree and thereby influenced the interference pattern only to a comparable extent. In other words, if one does not insist that the method used to determine which slit each photon passes through be completely reliable, one can still detect a (degraded) interference pattern.

Delayed choice and quantum eraser variations

Wheeler's delayed choice experiments demonstrate that extracting "which path" information after a particle passes through the slits can seem to retroactively alter its previous behavior at the slits.

Quantum eraser experiments demonstrate that wave behavior can be restored by erasing or otherwise making permanently unavailable the "which path" information.

A simple do-it-at-home illustration of the quantum eraser phenomenon was given in an article in Scientific American. If one sets polarizers before each slit with their axes orthogonal to each other, the interference pattern will be eliminated. The polarizers can be considered as introducing which-path information to each beam. Introducing a third polarizer in front of the detector with an axis of 45° relative to the other polarizers "erases" this information, allowing the interference pattern to reappear. This can also be accounted for by considering the light to be a classical wave, and also when using circular polarizers and single photons. Implementations of the polarizers using entangled photon pairs have no classical explanation.

Weak measurement

In a highly publicized experiment in 2012, researchers claimed to have identified the path each particle had taken without any adverse effects at all on the interference pattern generated by the particles. In order to do this, they used a setup such that particles coming to the screen were not from a point-like source, but from a source with two intensity maxima. However, commentators such as Svensson have pointed out that there is in fact no conflict between the weak measurements performed in this variant of the double-slit experiment and the Heisenberg uncertainty principle. Weak measurement followed by post-selection did not allow simultaneous position and momentum measurements for each individual particle, but rather allowed measurement of the average trajectory of the particles that arrived at different positions. In other words, the experimenters were creating a statistical map of the full trajectory landscape.

Other variations

In 1967, Pfleegor and Mandel demonstrated two-source interference using two separate lasers as light sources.

It was shown experimentally in 1972 that in a double-slit system where only one slit was open at any time, interference was nonetheless observed provided the path difference was such that the detected photon could have come from either slit. The experimental conditions were such that the photon density in the system was much less than unity.

In 1999, a quantum interference experiment (using a diffraction grating, rather than two slits) was successfully performed with buckyball molecules (each of which comprises 60 carbon atoms). A buckyball is large enough (diameter about 0.7 nm, nearly half a million times larger than a proton) to be seen under an electron microscope.

In 2005, E. R. Eliel presented an experimental and theoretical study of the optical transmission of a thin metal screen perforated by two subwavelength slits, separated by many optical wavelengths. The total intensity of the far-field double-slit pattern is shown to be reduced or enhanced as a function of the wavelength of the incident light beam.

In 2012, researchers at the University of Nebraska–Lincoln performed the double-slit experiment with electrons as described by Richard Feynman, using new instruments that allowed control of the transmission of the two slits and the monitoring of single-electron detection events.  Electrons were fired by an electron gun and passed through one or two slits of 62 nm wide × 4 μm tall.

In 2013, a quantum interference experiment (using diffraction gratings, rather than two slits) was successfully performed with molecules that each comprised 810 atoms (whose total mass was over 10,000 atomic mass units). The record was raised to 2000 atoms (25,000 amu) in 2019.

Hydrodynamic pilot wave analogs

Hydrodynamic analogs have been developed that can recreate various aspects of quantum mechanical systems, including single-particle interference through a double-slit. A silicone oil droplet, bouncing along the surface of a liquid, self-propels via resonant interactions with its own wave field. The droplet gently sloshes the liquid with every bounce. At the same time, ripples from past bounces affect its course. The droplet's interaction with its own ripples, which form what is known as a pilot wave, causes it to exhibit behaviors previously thought to be peculiar to elementary particles – including behaviors customarily taken as evidence that elementary particles are spread through space like waves, without any specific location, until they are measured.

Behaviors mimicked via this hydrodynamic pilot-wave system include quantum single particle diffraction, tunneling, quantized orbits, orbital level splitting, spin, and multimodal statistics. It is also possible to infer uncertainty relations and exclusion principles.  Videos are available illustrating various features of this system. (See the External links.)

However, more complicated systems that involve two or more particles in superposition are not amenable to such a simple, classically intuitive explanation. Accordingly, no hydrodynamic analog of entanglement has been developed. Nevertheless, optical analogs are possible.

Classical wave-optics formulation

Much of the behaviour of light can be modelled using classical wave theory.  The Huygens–Fresnel principle is one such model; it states that each point on a wavefront generates a secondary wavelet, and that the disturbance at any subsequent point can be found by summing the contributions of the individual wavelets at that point. This summation needs to take into account the phase as well as the amplitude of the individual wavelets. Only the intensity of a light field can be measured—this is proportional to the square of the amplitude.

In the double-slit experiment, the two slits are illuminated by the quasi-monochromatic light of a single laser.  If the width of the slits is small enough (much less than the wavelength of the laser light), the slits diffract the light into cylindrical waves. These two cylindrical wavefronts are superimposed, and the amplitude, and therefore the intensity, at any point in the combined wavefronts depends on both the magnitude and the phase of the two wavefronts. The difference in phase between the two waves is determined by the difference in the distance travelled by the two waves.

If the viewing distance is large compared with the separation of the slits (the far field), the phase difference can be found using the geometry shown in the figure below right.  The path difference between two waves travelling at an angle  is given by:

Where d is the distance between the two slits. When the two waves are in phase, i.e. the path difference is equal to an integral number of wavelengths, the summed amplitude, and therefore the summed intensity is maximum, and when they are in anti-phase, i.e. the path difference is equal to half a wavelength, one and a half wavelengths, etc., then the two waves cancel and the summed intensity is zero.  This effect is known as interference.  The interference fringe maxima occur at angles

where λ is the wavelength of the light. The angular spacing of the fringes, is given by

The spacing of the fringes at a distance  from the slits is given by

For example, if two slits are separated by 0.5 mm, and are illuminated with a 0.6 μm wavelength laser, then at a distance of 1 m, the spacing of the fringes will be 1.2 mm.

If the width of the slits  is appreciable compared to the wavelength, the Fraunhofer diffraction equation is needed to determine the intensity of the diffracted light as follows:

where the sinc function is defined as sinc(x) = sin(x)/x for x ≠ 0, and sinc(0) = 1.

This is illustrated in the figure above, where the first pattern is the diffraction pattern of a single slit, given by the  function in this equation, and the second figure shows the combined intensity of the light diffracted from the two slits, where the  function represents the fine structure, and the coarser structure represents diffraction by the individual slits as described by the  function.

Similar calculations for the near field can be made by applying the Fresnel diffraction equation, which implies that as the plane of observation gets closer to the plane in which the slits are located, the diffraction patterns associated with each slit decrease in size, so that the area in which interference occurs is reduced, and may vanish altogether when there is no overlap in the two diffracted patterns.

Interpretations of the experiment
Like the Schrödinger's cat thought experiment, the double-slit experiment is often used to highlight the differences and similarities between the various interpretations of quantum mechanics.

Copenhagen interpretation

The Copenhagen interpretation, put forth by some of the pioneers in the field of quantum mechanics, asserts that it is undesirable to posit anything that goes beyond the mathematical formulae and the kinds of physical apparatus and reactions that enable us to gain some knowledge of what goes on at the atomic scale. One of the mathematical constructs that enables experimenters to predict very accurately certain experimental results is sometimes called a probability wave. In its mathematical form it is analogous to the description of a physical wave, but its "crests" and "troughs" indicate levels of probability for the occurrence of certain phenomena (e.g., a spark of light at a certain point on a detector screen) that can be observed in the macro world of ordinary human experience.

The probability "wave" can be said to "pass through space" because the probability values that one can compute from its mathematical representation are dependent on time. One cannot speak of the location of any particle such as a photon between the time it is emitted and the time it is detected simply because in order to say that something is located somewhere at a certain time one has to detect it. The requirement for the eventual appearance of an interference pattern is that particles be emitted, and that there be a screen with at least two distinct paths for the particle to take from the emitter to the detection screen. Experiments observe nothing whatsoever between the time of emission of the particle and its arrival at the detection screen. If a ray tracing is next made as if a light wave (as understood in classical physics) is wide enough to take both paths, then that ray tracing will accurately predict the appearance of maxima and minima on the detector screen when many particles pass through the apparatus and gradually "paint" the expected interference pattern.

Path-integral formulation

The Copenhagen interpretation is similar to the path integral formulation of quantum mechanics provided by Feynman.  The path integral formulation replaces the classical notion of a single, unique trajectory for a system, with a sum over all possible trajectories.  The trajectories are added together by using functional integration.

Each path is considered equally likely, and thus contributes the same amount.  However, the phase of this contribution at any given point along the path is determined by the action along the path:

All these contributions are then added together, and the magnitude of the final result is squared, to get the probability distribution for the position of a particle:

As is always the case when calculating probability, the results must then be normalized by imposing:

To summarize, the probability distribution of the outcome is the normalized square of the norm of the superposition, over all paths from the point of origin to the final point, of waves propagating proportionally to the action along each path.  The differences in the cumulative action along the different paths (and thus the relative phases of the contributions) produces the interference pattern observed by the double-slit experiment.  Feynman stressed that his formulation is merely a mathematical description, not an attempt to describe a real process that we can measure.

Relational interpretation

According to the relational interpretation of quantum mechanics, first proposed by Carlo Rovelli, observations such as those in the double-slit experiment result specifically from the interaction between the observer (measuring device) and the object being observed (physically interacted with), not any absolute property possessed by the object. In the case of an electron, if it is initially "observed" at a particular slit, then the observer–particle (photon–electron) interaction includes information about the electron's position. This partially constrains the particle's eventual location at the screen. If it is "observed" (measured with a photon) not at a particular slit but rather at the screen, then there is no "which path" information as part of the interaction, so the electron's "observed" position on the screen is determined strictly by its probability function. This makes the resulting pattern on the screen the same as if each individual electron had passed through both slits.

Many-worlds interpretation
Physicist David Deutsch argues in his book The Fabric of Reality that the double-slit experiment is evidence for the many-worlds interpretation. However, since every interpretation of quantum mechanics is empirically indistinguishable, some scientists are skeptical of this claim.

De Broglie–Bohm theory
An alternative to the standard understanding of quantum mechanics, the De Broglie–Bohm theory states that particles also have precise locations at all times, and that their velocities are defined by the wave-function. So while a single particle will travel through one particular slit in the double-slit experiment, the so-called "pilot wave" that influences it will travel through both. The two slit de Broglie-Bohm trajectories were first calculated by Chris Dewdney while working with Chris Philippidis and Basil Hiley at Birkbeck College (London). The de Broglie-Bohm theory produces the same statistical results as standard quantum mechanics, but dispenses with many of its conceptual difficulties.

See also

 Complementarity (physics)
 Delayed choice quantum eraser
 Diffraction from slits
 Dual-polarization interferometry
 Elitzur–Vaidman bomb tester
 N-slit interferometer
 Photon polarization
 Quantum coherence
 Schrödinger's cat
 Young's interference experiment
 Measurement problem
 Hydrodynamic quantum analogs
 Pilot wave theory

References

Further reading

External links

Interactive animations
 Huygens and interference

Single particle experiments
  Website with the movie and other information from the first single electron experiment by Merli, Missiroli, and Pozzi.
 Movie showing single electron events build up to form an interference pattern in double-slit experiments. Several versions with and without narration (File size = 3.6 to 10.4 MB) (Movie Length = 1m 8s)
 Freeview video 'Electron Waves Unveil the Microcosmos' A Royal Institution Discourse by Akira Tonomura provided by the Vega Science Trust
 Hitachi website that provides background on Tonomura video and link to the video

Hydrodynamic analog
 "Single-particle interference observed for macroscopic objects"
 Pilot-Wave Hydrodynamics: Supplemental Video
 Through the Wormhole: Yves Couder . Explains Wave/Particle Duality via Silicon Droplets

Computer simulations
 Java demonstration of Young's double slit interference
 A simulation that runs in Mathematica Player, in which the number of quantum particles, the frequency of the particles, and the slit separation can be independently varied

Foundational quantum physics
Physics experiments
Wave mechanics